The 1963 Australian Tourist Trophy was a motor race staged at the Lowood circuit in Queensland, Australia on 9 June 1963. It was the seventh annual Australian Tourist Trophy race, and it was recognized by the Confederation of Australian Motor Sport as the Australian championship for sports cars. The race, which was organised by the Queensland Racing Drivers' Club, was won by Ian Geoghegan, driving a Lotus 23.

Results

Race statistics
 Race distance: 27 laps – 80 miles
 Number of starters: 29
 Number of finishers: not yet ascertained
 Winner's race time: 55 minutes 23.0 seconds
 Fastest lap: 1 minute 57.5 seconds, Ian Geoghegan, (Lotus 23)

References

Australian Tourist Trophy
Tourist Trophy
Sports competitions in Queensland
Motorsport in Queensland